A responsibility assignment matrix (RAM), also known as RACI matrix or linear responsibility chart (LRC), describes the participation by various roles in completing tasks or deliverables for a project or business process. RACI is an acronym derived from the four key responsibilities most typically used: responsible, accountable, consulted, and informed.  It is used for clarifying and defining roles and responsibilities in cross-functional or departmental projects and processes. There are a number of alternatives to the RACI model.

Key responsibility roles in RACI model

Role distinction 
There is a distinction between a role and individually identified people: a role is a descriptor of an associated set of tasks; may be performed by many people; and one person can perform many roles. For example, an organization may have ten people who can perform the role of project manager, although traditionally each project only has one project manager at any one time; and a person who is able to perform the role of project manager may also be able to perform the role of business analyst and tester.

R = Responsible (also recommender)
 Those who do the work to complete the task. There is at least one role with a participation type of responsible, although others can be delegated to assist in the work required (see also RASCI below for separately identifying those who participate in a supporting role)

A = Accountable (also approver or final approving authority)
 The one ultimately answerable for the correct and thorough completion of the deliverable or task, the one who ensures the prerequisites of the task are met and who delegates the work to those responsible. In other words, an accountable must sign off (approve) work that responsible provides. There must be only one accountable specified for each task or deliverable.

C = Consulted (sometimes consultant or counsel)
 Those whose opinions are sought, typically subject-matter experts; and with whom there is two-way communication.

I = Informed (also informee)
 Those who are kept up-to-date on progress, often only on completion of the task or deliverable; and with whom there is just one-way communication.

Very often the role that is accountable for a task or deliverable may also be responsible for completing it (indicated on the matrix by the task or deliverable having a role accountable for it, but no role responsible for its completion, i.e. it is implied). Outside of this exception, it is generally recommended that each role in the project or process for each task receive, at most, just one of the participation types. Where more than one participation type is shown, this generally implies that participation has not yet been fully resolved, which can impede the value of this technique in clarifying the participation of each role on each task.

Assigning people to facilities 

The matrix is typically created with a vertical axis (left-hand column) of tasks (from a work breakdown structure) or deliverables (from a product breakdown structure), and a horizontal axis (top row) of roles (from an organizational chart).

Another example from the maintenance and reliability community

Alternatives 
There are a number of alternatives to the RACI participation types:

RACI ROLES SHORTEN:
Roles are the following
 Responsible
 Does the work to complete the task  
 Accountable 
 Delegates work and is the last one to review the task or deliverable before it's deemed complete
 Consulted 
 Provides input based on either how it will impact their future project work or their domain of expertise on the deliverable itself
 Informed 
 Needs to be kept in the loop on project progress, rather than roped into details of every deliverable

PARIS 
This is an early version of a responsibility assignment matrix, with the roles defined as:

 Participant

 Accountable

 Review required

 Input required

 Sign-off required

PACSI 
 This is a version very useful to organizations where the output of activities under the accountability of a single person/function can be reviewed and vetoed by multiple stakeholders, due to the collaborative nature of the culture.

 Perform

 The person/function carrying out the activity.

 Accountable

 The person/function ultimately answerable for the correct and thorough completion of the deliverable or task, and often the one who delegates the work to the performer.

 Control
 The person/function reviewing the result of the activity. They have a right of veto; their advice is binding.

 Suggest

 The person/function consulted to give advice based upon recognized expertise. The advice is non-binding.

 Informed

 The person/function who must be informed of the result of the activity.

RASIC or RASCI 
This is an expanded version of the standard RACI, less frequently known as RASCI, breaking the responsible participation into:

 Responsible

Those responsible for the task, who ensure that it is done as per the approver

 Support
 Resources allocated to responsible. Unlike consulted, who may provide input to the task, support helps complete the task.

RASI 
This is an alternative version of the standard RACI, foregoing the consulted participation and replacing it with:
 
 Support
 Resources which play a supporting role in implementation.

RACI + F 

This is an expanded version of the standard RACI, with an additional participation type: Facilitate. This variation was introduced by Christophe Le Coent in 2012. Coent argued that the facilitator or coach role is important in agile software development environments and should therefore be explicitly included in the RAM. The use of RAM in Agile environments is considered contentious because some practitioners believe that everyone working in an agile team should be jointly responsible and accountable.

 Facilitates 
 Facilitate activities during a Scrum project.

RACIQ 

This is an expanded version of the standard RACI, with an additional participation type:

 Quality review 
 Those who check whether the product meets the quality requirements.

RACI-VS 
This is an expanded version of the standard RACI, with two additional participation types:

 Verifier
 Those who check whether the product meets the acceptance criteria set forth in the product description.

 Signatory

Those who approve the verify decision and authorize the product hand-off. It seems to make sense that the signatory should be the party being accountable for its success.

CAIRO 
This is an expanded version of the standard RACI, also known as RACIO with one additional participation type.

 Out of the loop (or omitted)
 Designating individuals or groups who are specifically not part of the task. Specifying that a resource does not participate can be as beneficial to a task's completion as specifying those who do participate.

DACI 
Another version that has been used to centralize decision making, and clarify who can re-open discussions.

 Driver
 A single driver of overall project like the person steering a car.

 Approver
 One or more approvers who make most project decisions, and are responsible if it fails.

 Contributors
 Are the worker-bees who are responsible for deliverables; and with whom there is two-way communication.

 Informed
 Those who are impacted by the project and are provided status and informed of decisions; and with whom there is one-way communication.

RAPID 
Another tool used to clarify decision roles and thereby improve decision making, is RAPID, which was created by and is a registered trademark of Bain & Company.

 Recommend
 The recommend role typically involves 80 percent of the work in a decision. The recommender gathers relevant input and proposes a course of action—sometimes alternative courses, complete with pros and cons so that the decision maker's choices are as clear, simple and timely as possible.

 Agree
 The agree role represents a formal approval of a recommendation. The 'A' and the 'R' should work together to come to a mutually satisfactory proposal to bring forward to the decider. But not all decisions will need an agree role, as this is typically reserved for those situations where some form of regulatory or compliance sign-off is required.

 Perform
 The perform role defines who is accountable for executing or implementing the decision once it is made. Best-practice companies typically define P's and gather input from them early in the process.

 Input
 The input role provides relevant information and facts so that the recommender and decider can assess all the relevant facts to make the right decision. However, the 'I' role is strictly advisory. Recommenders should consider all input, but they don't have to reflect every point of view in the final recommendation.

 Decide
 The decide role is for the single person who ultimately is accountable for making the final decision, committing the group to action and ensuring the decision gets implemented.

RATSI 
Another tool used in organization design or roles analysis.

 Responsibility
 Identify who is in charge of making sure the work is done.

 Authority
 Identify who has final decision power on the work.

 Task
 Identify who actually does the work.

 Support
 Identify who is involved to provide support to the work.

 Informed
 Identify who is informed that the work has been done (or will be started)

DRASCI 
A variant of RASCI developed by three Whitehall theorists (Kane, Jackson, Gilbert). This scheme is adapted for use in matrix management environments, and differs only from RASCI in having an additional role of Driver and a narrower definition of Support:

 Driver
 An individual or party that assists those who are responsible for delivering a task by both producing supporting collateral and setting timescales for delivery in line with the overarching aim of the individual or party who is accountable for the overall accomplishment of the objective. The distinction between driver and support lies in that the former reinforces and clarifies the parameters of the task on behalf of those who are accountable, while the latter refers to those who help those who are responsible in reaching a given goal.

PDQA 
 A version developed at U Tokyo and MIT for model-based project management.  The PDQA set of roles corresponds to demand for capabilities of teams. Roles include those for work on scope, handling of dependencies as coordination, and exception handling through error detection and decisions across a project organization.  PDQA is used in agent-based modeling to simulate the supply of these capabilities by teams in projects.

 Primary
 Provides skill-based effort within capacity to complete scope and also manages dependencies through coordination.

 Decision
 Handles any decision, including scope acceptable and exception handling decisions leading to rework. (Does not generation nominal scope).

 Quality
 Reviews scope as it progresses to detect poor quality and escalates to decision-maker as so. (Does not general nominal scope).

 Assist
 Provides skill-based effort with the capacity to complete scope, in assistance to the primary. (Does not manage dependencies through coordination).

DCI 
 A minimal set of decision-making categories used in organisation design or roles analysis.

 Decision maker
 Individuals who make the decision and is accountable for its impact on the business.

 Consulted
 Individuals accountable for providing guidance based on functional expertise and experience, highlighting issues and raising alternatives to support the Decision Maker.

 Informed
 Impacted stakeholders are notified after the decision has been made and who will need to support the execution of the decision.

RASCEIO 

To be used when working on governance, risk, compliance (GRC) and outsourcing matters: 
 Responsible

 Accountable

 Support

 Consult

 Execute
 Third parties contracted to execute activities in accordance with a service level agreement
 Inform

 Overview
 Key GRC roles, such as risk owner, policy owner - where accountability is devolved, but a role is needed to oversee whether accountabilities all fit together

Variations 

There are also a number of variations to the meaning of RACI participation types:

RACI (alternative scheme) 

There is an alternative coding, less widely published but used by some practitioners and process mapping software, which modifies the application of the R and A codes of the original scheme. The overall methodology remains the same but this alternative avoids potential confusion of the terms accountable and responsible, which may be understood by management professionals but not always so clearly differentiated by others:

 Responsible
 Those responsible for the performance of the task. There should be exactly one person with this assignment for each task.

 Assists
Those who assist in the completion of the task

 Consulted
 Those whose opinions are sought; and with whom there is two-way communication.

 Informed
 Those who are kept up-to-date on progress; and with whom there is one-way communication.

ARCI (decisions) 

This alternative is focused only on documenting who has the authority to make which decisions. This can work across all sized workgroups.

 Accountable
 Authorized to approve an answer to the decision.

 Responsible
 Responsible to recommend an answer to the decision.

 Consulted
 Those whose opinions are sought, and with whom there is two-way communication.

 Informed
 Those who are informed after the decision is made, and with whom there is one-way communication.

References

External links 
 Comprehensive Series on RACI
 Assignment

Project management techniques
Management cybernetics
Business terms